Don Warhurst (born c. 1920 – November 10, 2001) was an American football coach and college athletics administrator.  He served as the head football coach at California State Polytechnic University, Pomona from 1957 to 1966, compiling record of 56–33–2.  Warhurst was the athletic director at the school from 1969 to 1980.

Warhust was a graduate of the University of California, Berkeley.  He was an assistant coach at Santa Ana High School before serving as line coach at San Bernardino Valley College in 1950.  From 1951 to 1956, Warhust was the head football coach at Modesto High School.  He died at the age of 81, on November 10, 2001, the Pomona Valley Hospital Medical Center in Pomona, California.

Head coaching record

References

2001 deaths
Cal Poly Pomona Broncos athletic directors
Cal Poly Pomona Broncos football coaches
High school football coaches in California
Junior college football coaches in the United States
University of California, Berkeley alumni
Year of birth uncertain